Campsey or Campsie ( or Camasaigh, meaning "River Bends") is a small village in County Londonderry, Northern Ireland. In the 2001 Census it had a population of 195 people. It is near Derry city and within the Derry and Strabane district area.

Campsey is an industrial zone with a business park.

References 

NI Neighbourhood Information System

Villages in County Londonderry
Derry and Strabane district